Asadabad (also Romanized as Asadābād; also known as Asadābād-e Zand) is a village in Ramsheh Rural District, Jarqavieh Olya District, Isfahan County, Isfahan Province, Iran. At the 2006 census, its population was 52, in 12 families.

References 

Populated places in Isfahan County